Hamdan Nasser (Arabic:حمدان ناصر) (born 24 April 1997) is an Emirati footballer. He currently plays as a defender for Al Bataeh on loan from Shabab Al-Ahli .

References

External links
 

Emirati footballers
1997 births
Living people
Al-Ittihad Kalba SC players
Shabab Al-Ahli Club players
Fujairah FC players
Khor Fakkan Sports Club players
Al Bataeh Club players
Association football defenders
UAE First Division League players
UAE Pro League players